The Yuneec Power Drive 10 is a Chinese electric motor for powering electric aircraft, designed and produced by Yuneec International of Kunshan, Jiangsu.

Design and development
The Power Drive 10 is part of a family of scalable electric motor designs produced by Yuneec. The Power Drive 10+ produces the same power but at a reduced rpm.

The family of engines is designed to use the company's own power controller, Lithium polymer battery pack and charger, as an integrated package of components. This ensures that all components are compatible and also removes the need for aircraft builders to separately source components.

The Power Drive 10 is a brushless 67 volt design producing , with an outrunner. The low working rpm of the engine means that it can turn a propeller at efficient speeds without the need for a reduction drive.

Variants
Power Drive 10
Power Drive 10+

Applications
Yuneec International EPac paramotor
Yuneec International ETrike ultralight trike

Specifications (Power Drive 10)

See also

References

External links

Aircraft electric engines